Raduzhny is a closed town in Vladimir Oblast, Russia, located on the Pol, Buzha, and Uzhbol Rivers,  south of Vladimir. Population:

History
It was established in 1971 as a settlement for the workers of a defense industry design bureau. In 1977, it was granted work settlement status and named Vladimir-30. In 1991, it was granted town status and renamed Raduzhny.

Administrative and municipal status
Within the framework of administrative divisions, it is incorporated as the closed administrative-territorial formation of Raduzhny—an administrative unit with the status equal to that of the districts. As a municipal division, the closed administrative-territorial formation of Raduzhny is incorporated as Raduzhny Urban Okrug.

References

Notes

Sources

Cities and towns in Vladimir Oblast
Cities and towns built in the Soviet Union
Populated places established in 1971
Naukograds
1971 establishments in the Soviet Union